Heat shock 70 kDa protein 14 also known as HSP70-like protein 1 or heat shock protein HSP60 is a protein that in humans is encoded by the HSPA14 gene.

References

Further reading

External links 
 

Heat shock proteins